Hilal Alsahil Sports Club is a Sudanese football club founded in 1937 in Port Sudan. They played in the top division in Sudanese football, Sudan Premier League. Their home stadium is Stade Port Sudan. Their rival is Hay Al Arab, a team also based in Port Sudan.

Honours

National titles
Sudan Premier League
Champions (1) :1992

Sudan Cup
Runner-up (2) :1991, 1995

Performance in CAF competitions

CAF Champions League
CAF Champions League 1 appearance

CAF Confederation Cup
CAF Confederation Cup: 1 appearance

CAF Cup
CAF Cup: 1 appearance

Performance in CECAFA competitions

CECAFA Clubs Cup
CECAFA Clubs Cup 2 appearances

Players

External links
Official Website in Arabic
Team profile – goalzz.com

Football clubs in Sudan
Association football clubs established in 1937